Curjel and Moser was an architectural firm set up by Robert Curjel and Karl Moser in 1888 in Karlsruhe, Germany. They designed about 400 buildings in Germany and Switzerland. In 1915, following the start of the World War I, the firm was dissolved and Moser became professor at ETH Zurich. Many of the office's surviving buildings are now listed monuments. In Karlsruhe-Knielingen, Curjel-und-Moser-Strasse was named after the architects in 2008.

Buildings designed by Curjel and Moser 
 St John's Church in Bern (1892-93)
 St. Sebastian in Wettingen (1895)
 St Paul's Church in Basel (1898-1901)
 Rheinlust in Rheinfelden (1899-1900)
 St Paul's Church in Bern (1902-05)
 Kunsthaus Zürich (1904-10)
 Badischer Bahnhof in Basel (1910-13)
 University of Zürich (1911-14)
 Concert hall in Karlsruhe (1913-15)

References 

 Leonardo Benevolo, History of Modern Architecture, Volume 2. (MIT Press, 1977), p. 618

German companies established in 1888
Swiss companies established in 1888
Companies based in Karlsruhe
Companies based in Basel
Design companies disestablished in 1915
Architecture firms of Germany
Architecture firms of Switzerland
Design companies established in 1888